Lara Burić (born 13 August 2003) is a Croatian handballer for RK Lokomotiva Zagreb and the Croatian national team.

She represented Croatia at the 2021 World Women's Handball Championship.

References

2003 births
Living people
Croatian female handball players
Handball players from Zagreb
21st-century Croatian women